Paschalia is a settlement in the municipality Xanthi in the Xanthi regional unit of Greece.

Populated places in Xanthi (regional unit)